Anna Thompson (born 11 December 1976 in Melbourne) is an Australian runner who specializes in cross-country running.

Achievements

Personal bests
1500 metres - 4:16.51 min (2005)
3000 metres - 8:58.93 min (2006)
5000 metres - 15:42.31 min (2004)
10,000 metres - 32:27.74 min (2006)
Half marathon - 1:11:38 min (2007)
Marathon - 2:33:20 min (2005)

References

1976 births
Living people
Australian female long-distance runners
Sportswomen from Victoria (Australia)
Athletes from Melbourne
Athletes (track and field) at the 2002 Commonwealth Games
Athletes (track and field) at the 2006 Commonwealth Games
Commonwealth Games competitors for Australia
20th-century Australian women
21st-century Australian women